Guraleus jacksonensis is a species of sea snail, a marine gastropod mollusk in the family Mangeliidae.

This species is considered a synonym of Guraleus (Euguraleus) tasmanicus (Tenison-Woods, 1876) by the Australian Faunal Directory and by Ch. Hedley in 1922.

Description
The length of the shell attains 12 mm.

(Original description) The shell is elongately fusiformly turreted, solid, pale fulvous yellow. It contains 7 whorls, angulated and flattened at the upper part. The shell is longitudinally somewhat prominently ribbed, the ribs slightly nodulous at the angle of the whorl, the interstices crossed with narrow grooved lines in pairs, which are interrupted by the longitudinal ribs. The aperture is elongately ovate. The thin outer lip is simple. The base of the columella is sometimes tinged with brown. The posterior sinus is very shallow.

Distribution
This marine species is endemic to Australia and can be found off New South Wales.

References

 Brazier, J. 1889. Notes and critical remarks on a donation of shells sent to the Museum of the Conchological Society of Great Britain and Ireland. Journal of Conchology 6: 66-84 
 Laseron, C. 1954. Revision of the New South Wales Turridae (Mollusca). Australian Zoological Handbook. Sydney : Royal Zoological Society of New South Wales 1-56, pls 1-12.

External links
  Tucker, J.K. 2004 Catalog of recent and fossil turrids (Mollusca: Gastropoda). Zootaxa 682:1-1295.
 

jacksonensis
Gastropods described in 1877
Gastropods of Australia